Stráža is a village and municipality in Žilina District in the Žilina Region of northern Slovakia.

History
In historical records the village was first mentioned in 1439.

Geography
The municipality lies at an altitude of 398 metres and covers an area of 3.174 km². It has a population of about 657 people.

External links
http://www.statistics.sk/mosmis/eng/run.html

Villages and municipalities in Žilina District